The white-throated fantail (Rhipidura albicollis) is a small passerine bird. It is found in forest, scrub and cultivation across tropical southern Asia from the Himalayas, India and Bangladesh east to Indonesia. The white-spotted fantail (R. albogularis) until recently was considered a subspecies.

Description
It has a dark fan-shaped tail, edged in white, and white supercilium and throat. There is otherwise much variation in plumage between races. Most resemble the Himalayan R. a. canescans which is mainly slate grey above and below, with a black eye mask, and a white throat and eyebrow.

Local names for the bird in India include Nasoni sorai (Assamese).

Behaviour
The white-throated fantail lays three eggs in a small cup nest in a tree. It is insectivorous, and often fans its tail as it moves through the undergrowth.

They are white in colour, with a band of brown spots around the middle, closer towards the base of the egg. 

Birds use the same song year after year, with progressively small changes, with the result that the song sounds very different after 4–5 years. The male's call is a valuable tool in detection and identification of the bird, which can often be confused with the white-browed fantail, R. aureola, where their ranges overlap. R. aureola has light underparts and prominent spots in two rows on the wings.

Subspecies 
According to IOC there are 9  recognised subspecies. In alphabetical order, these are:

 R. a. albicollis (Vieillot, 1818)
 R. a. atrata Salvadori, 1879
 R. a. canescens (Koelz, 1939)
 R. a. celsa Riley, 1929
 R. a. cinerascens	Delacour, 1927
 R. a. kinabalu Chasen, 1941
 R. a. orissae	Ripley, 1955
 R. a. sarawacensis Chasen, 1941
 R. a. stanleyi Baker, 1916

Gallery

References

 Birds of India by Grimmett, Inskipp and Inskipp, 

white-throated fantail
Birds of the Himalayas
Birds of East India
Birds of South China
Birds of Southeast Asia
white-throated fantail
white-throated fantail